Angostura Formation may refer to:
 Angostura Colorada Formation, Late Cretaceous geologic formation of Argentina
 Angostura Formation, Chile, Early to Middle Miocene geologic formation of Chile
 Angostura Formation, Colombia, Eocene geologic formation of Colombia
 Angostura Formation, Ecuador, Late Miocene geologic formation of Ecuador
 Angostura Formation, Mexico, Late Miocene geologic formation of Mexico